The locations, lands, and nations mentioned in the Bible are not all listed here. Some locations might appear twice, each time under a different name. Only places having their own Wikipedia articles are included: see also the list of minor biblical places for locations which do not have their own Wikipedia article.

A
 Absalom's Monument
 Achaia
 Ai
 Akko
 Akkad – Mesopotamian state
 Ammon – Canaanite state
 Attalia – In Asia Minor
 Antioch – In Asia Minor
 Arabia – (in biblical times and until the 7th century AD Arabia was confined to the Arabian Peninsula)
 Aram/Aramea – (Modern Syria)
 Arbela (Erbil/Irbil) – Assyrian city
 Archevite
 Ariel
 Armenia – Indo-European kingdom of eastern Asia Minor and southern Caucasus.
 Arrapkha – Assyrian City, modern Kirkuk
 Ashdod
 Ashkelon
 Ashur/Asshur/Assur – Capital city of Assyria
 Assyria – Mesopotamian Semitic state

B
 Baal-hazor – Canaanite city
 Babel
 Babylon/Babylonia – Mesopotamian state
 Beer-Sheba
 Beit El
 Beirut
 Berea
 Beth-Anath
 Bethany
 Bethel
 Bethharan
 Bethlehem
 Bethsaida
 Beth Shemesh in Judah (distinct from those in Naphtali and Issachar)
 Bochim
 Byblos – Phoenician state
 Beersheba
 Betshean

C
 Cabul
 Calah/Kalhu/Nimrud – Assyrian city
 Calneh – Assyrian city
 Cana – Galilee
 Canaan – Region on the Eastern shore of the Mediterranean
 Capernaum
 Cappadocia – Region in Asia Minor
 Carchemish – Assyrian city
 Caria – Nation in Asia Minor
 Cenchrea
 Chezib of Judah
 Chorazin
 Cilicia – Nation in Asia Minor
 Crete, Greek island
 Commagene – Nation in Asia Minor
 Corduene – Nation in central Asia Minor, homeland of the Kurds
 Corinth, City in Greece
 Cush – African state
 Chaldea – Mesopotamian state, eventually encompassing Babylonia
Cyprus

D
Damascus

E
 Ebla – East Semitic state in northern Syria
 Edom –Ancient kingdom in Transjordan
 Egypt
 Ekron
 Elam – Pre-Iranic Nation in Ancient Iran
 Elim
 Emmaus
 En-hakkore
 En Gedi
 Ephesia/Ephesus – Greek city in Asia Minor
 Eridu – Mesopotamian city
 Eritrea- Erythraean Sea Ancient name for Red Sea and surrounding region
 Eshcol
 Eshnunna – Mesopotamian city state
 Ethiopia
 Etham

G
 Gabbatha
 Galilee
 Garden of Eden
 Gath
Gaul – modern France
 Gaza
 Georgia
 Gethsemane
 Gibeon
 Gilead
 Golgotha
 Gomorrah
 Goshen
 Great Sea – Mediterranean Sea in the Bible
 Greece
 Gutium – state in Iran

H
 Heaven
 Haran
 Harran – Assyrian City
 Hattusa – Capital of Hittite Empire in Asia Minor
 Hatti – Nation in Asia Minor
 Havilah
 Hazazon Tamar (also Hazazon-tamar or Hatzatzon-Tamar) – Ein Gedi
 Hebron
 Helam
 Hell
 Hill of Gash
 Hurri Nation – Nation in Asia Minor

I
 Israel
Imgur-Enlil – Assyrian City
 India – Esther 1:1

J
 Jabbok
 Jaffa
 Jarmuth (Yarmut)
 Jerash (Gerasa)
 Jeshanah
 Jericho
 Jerusalem
 Jordan River
 Judah
 Judea

K
 Kabzeel
 Kadesh-Barnea
 Kaska – Nation in Asia Minor
 Kassite state – in Iran
 Keilah
 Kiriath-Jearim – City in Gibeon
 Kish – Mesopotamian City State
 Kush/Cush – in northeast Africa

L
 Lachish
 Laish
 Laodicea
 Larsa – Mesopotamian city
 Lebanon
 Lehi
 Lycia – Nation in Asia Minor
 Lydia – Nation in Asia Minor
 Lystra

M
 Machpela
Macedonia – current North Macedonia
 Magan – Pre-Arab state in Oman
Maltese Archipelago
 Mamre Plain
 Mannea – Nation in Iran
 Marah
 Mari – Assyrian city
 Mareshah
 Media – Nation in Iran
 Megiddo
 Meluhha – Pre-Arab state in the Arabian Peninsula
 Memphis
 Mesopotamia – Includes the kingdoms of Sumer, Akkad, Assyria, Babylonia, Chaldea, and the neo Assyrian states of Adiabene, Osroene and Hatra.
 Midian
 Moab – Cannanite state
 Mount Carmel
 Mount Ephraim
 Mount Hermon
 Mount Nebo
 Mount of Olives
 Mount Sinai
 Mount Tabor
 Mount Zemaraim
 Mount Zion
 Mysia – state in Asia Minor

N
 Nahor
 Nahrain (Mesopotamia)
 Nazareth
 Nimrud – later name for the Assyrian city of Kalhu/Calah
 Nineveh – Capital of Assyria
Nile – river in northeastern Africa
 Nod

O
 Ono
 Ophir
 Opis – Mesopotamian/Babylonian City (Jachel Dumitru Narcis gr 3)
 Osroene – Neo-Assyrian state

P
 Palestine
 Palmyra – Aramean state in Syria
 Paran
 Parthia – Nation in Iran
 Penuel
 Perga – Town In Asia Minor
 Persia – Nation in Iran
 Petra
 Philistia – Original name of Palestine
 Phrygia – Nation in Asia Minor
 Phut
Phoenicia
 Pithom
 Punt
 Puqudu, as "Pekod"
 Patmos

R
 Ramathlehi
 Rapiqum – Assyrian City
 Rehoboth (Bible)
 Rephidim
Roman Empire – Rome
 *[Rhoana]

S
 Samaria – Nation of the Samaritans
 Sardis
 Scythia – Nation in Asia Minor
 Shalem
 Sheba – Pre-Arab state in Yemen
 Shechem
 Sheol
 Shiloh
 Shinar – Mesopotamian city
 Shomron
 Shubat-Enlil – Assyrian city
 Shur (Bible), also Sur (wilderness of ~, way of ~)
 Sidon
 Sin Desert
 Sinai
 Smyrna
 Sodom
 Spain – Romans 15.24
 Sumer/Sumeria – Mesopotamian state and region
 Syria/Aramea

T
 Tabal – Georgian state in Asia Minor
 Tarshish
 Tel Dan
 Til-barsip – Assyrian city
 Timnath-serah
 Timnath
 Trachonitis
 Tushhan – Assyrian city
 Tyre

U
 Ugarit – Amorite state
 Umma – Mesopotamian state and city
 Ur – Mesopotamian state and city
 Urartu – Hurrian state in the Caucasus
 Urkish – Mesopotamian state and city
 Uruk – Mesopotamian state and city
 The Land of Uz

V
 Via Dolorosa

X
Xaloth – the biblical Chesulloth (now Iksal)

Y
 Yarmut: see Jarmuth

Z
 Zaanan
 Zair
 Zalmonah
 Zanoah
 Zareah
 Zartanah
 Zelah, Judea (Zelahzaliya)
 Zelzah
 Zemaraim
 Zephi
 Zeredathah
 Zorah
 Zion
 Zoba

See also
 List of biblical names
 List of Hebrew place names
 List of modern names for biblical place names
 Cities in the Book of Joshua

 
Places